Preppy or preppie, is an American subculture associated with private university-preparatory schools.

Preppy, preppie, or preppies may also refer to:

 Preppie (album), by American R&B artist Cheryl Lynn
 Preppie! (video game), for the Atari 8-bit family
 Preppies (film), a 1984 comedy

See also

 
 
 
 
 Prepper (disambiguation)
 Prep (disambiguation)